Sinikka Kukkonen (1 August 1947 – 25 July 2016) was a Finnish orienteering competitor. She is World Champion in both orienteering and ski orienteering. She became the first World Champion in ski orienteering, in 1975.

Orienteering career
At the World Orienteering Championships in 1970 Kukkonen placed 32nd in the individual event, and participated on the Finnish relay team that placed fourth. She was a member of the Finnish winning team at the 1972 World Orienteering Championships, together with team mates Pirjo Seppä and Liisa Veijalainen, and placed 25th in the individual contest. At the 1974 World Championships she placed 22nd in the individual, and fifth in the relay. She won a silver medal at the 1976 relay event, together with Outi Borgenström and Liisa Veijalainen, and placed seventh in the individual contest. She also participated in the 1978 World Championships, where she placed 22nd in the individual contest.

Ski orienteering career
Kukkonen participated at the first official World Ski Orienteering Championships, held in Hyvinkää, Finland, in 1975. At these championships she won a gold medal in the individual event, 46 seconds ahead of Agneta Månsson from Sweden. She also won a gold medal in the relay, together with team mates Raili Sallinen and Aila Flöjt. At the 1977 World Championships in Velingrad, Bulgaria, she won a gold medal in the relay, with Kaija Halonen and Aila Flöjt, and a bronze medal in the individual contest. In 1980 Kukkonen placed fourth in the individual contest, and won a gold medal with the Finnish relay team, together with Mirja Puhakka and Kaija Silvennoinen. At the 1982 World Championships she won a silver medal in the relay, together with team mates Sirpa Kukkonen and Mirja Puhakka, and she placed shared fourth in the individual contest.

See also
 Finnish orienteers
 List of orienteers
 List of orienteering events

References

1947 births
2016 deaths
Finnish orienteers
Female orienteers
Foot orienteers
Ski-orienteers
World Orienteering Championships medalists
People from Tervo
Sportspeople from North Savo